This is a partial list of molecules that contain 30 to 39 carbon atoms.

C30

C31

C32

C33

C34

C35

C36

C37

C38

C39

See also
 Carbon number

C30